Tony Hill may refer to:

 Tony Hill (Australian footballer) (born 1949), Australian footballer for Footscray
 Tony Hill (cricketer) (born 1952), New Zealand cricketer
 Tony Hill (umpire) (born 1951), international cricket umpire from New Zealand
 Tony Hill (wide receiver) (born 1956), American football player
 Tony Hill (politician) (born 1957), American politician from Florida
 Tony Hill, British musician, founder member of the band High Tide
 Tony Hill (defensive end) (born 1968), American football player
 Dr. Tony Hill, fictional psychologist in the TV show Wire in the Blood
 Tony Hill (boxer) (born 1986), British boxer

See also 
 Tony Hills, fictional character on EastEnders
 Tony Hills (American football) (born 1984), offensive tackle 
 Anthony Hill (disambiguation)